Blawith Knott is a hill in the south of the English Lake District, near Woodland, Cumbria. It is the subject of a chapter of Wainwright's book The Outlying Fells of Lakeland. He describes Blawith Knott as "a magnificent viewpoint", with both a panorama of Lake District fells to the north and, to the east to south, views which, on a clear day, include the Howgill Fells, Whernside and  Ingleborough.

References

Fells of the Lake District